Flyr may refer to:

 Lowell David Flyr, an American botanist
 Flyr, a defunct Norwegian low-cost airline

Disambiguation pages